Theddingworth is a village and civil parish in Leicestershire, England. The population of the civil parish at the 2011 census was 217. The parish includes the neighbouring hamlet of Hothorpe, which lies across the county boundary in Northamptonshire.

It is on the north bank of the River Welland, which forms the county border with Northamptonshire. The Grand Union Canal passes within a mile. There is a church and Congregational Chapel. Theddingworth railway station was a former stop on the Rugby to Market Harborough line.

References

External links

 'Theddingworth', A History of the County of Leicestershire: Volume 5: Gartree Hundred (1964), pp. 312–321. Retrieved 7 September 2008

Villages in Leicestershire
Civil parishes in Harborough District